Giovanni Battista Sidotti (1668 – 27 November 1714) was an Italian secular priest and Apostolic Missionary of the Pontifical Congregation of Propaganda Fide.  During the Edo period, he entered Japan illegally and was arrested, whereupon he was confined until his death.

The Japanese politician and scholar Arai Hakuseki published the Seiyō Kibun based on his conversations with Sidotti.

Life 

Sidotti was born in Sicily, Italy, in 1668. While working as a priest, he heard stories of missionary martyrdom in Japan, and he decided to go there, which, under Japanese law, was illegal at the time. After gaining permission from Pope Clement XI to go to Japan, he made his way as far as Manila, but he couldn't find a ship willing to deliver a missionary to Japan, which had closed itself off from the world under the sakoku policy.

Finally, he managed to find a ship willing to take him on board, and in September or October 1708, he landed on Yakushima.  He was disguised as a samurai, but immediately stood out as a Westerner. He was captured and taken to Nagasaki soon thereafter.

The next year, in 1709, he was taken to Edo and questioned directly by Japanese politician and Confucian scholar Arai Hakuseki. Hakuseki was impressed by Sidotti's demeanor and his level of scholarship, and developed a great deal of respect for him.  The feeling was mutual, and Sidotti grew to trust Arai. Here, for the first time since the beginning of sakoku in the previous century, was a meeting between two great scholars from the civilizations of Japan and western Europe. Among other things, Sidotti explained to Hakuseki that, contrary to what the Japanese believed at that time, Western missionaries were not the vanguards of Western armies.

Therefore, rejecting the common wisdom that it was best to torture Christians until they had abandoned their beliefs, Arai advised his superiors to follow three possible courses of action in dealing with foreigners.  Optimally, they should be deported.  If this was not possible, they should be imprisoned.  Execution should be a last resort.

Hakuseki's recommendation of deportation was completely unprecedented.  In the end, the government decided to jail Sidotti, sending him to the Kirishitan Yashiki (キリシタン屋敷, Christian Mansion) in Myōgadani (Present-day Kohinata, Bunkyō-ku, Tōkyō). The mansion was built in 1646 to house arrested missionaries, but due both to sakoku and a ban on religious indoctrination, between the time the mansion was built and Sidotti's arrest, it had never been used for this purpose.

Because he was unable to teach religion at Kirishitan Yashiki, Sidotti was, as a matter of course, exempt from torture. Furthermore, he would not be treated like a prisoner, but would be given special treatment, held under what was known as a go-nin fuchi (五人扶持, "5-man food ration") house arrest.  His guardians at the mansion were an old couple named Chōsuke and Haru, two former Christians who had renounced their faith.  When Sidotti tried to persuade the couple to return to Christianity, he was moved to an underground cell in the mansion, and it was there that he died in 1714. He was 46 years old.

Arai Hakuseki used the knowledge gained from his conversations with Sidotti to publish the Seiyō Kibun and the Sairan Igen.  An image taken from his belongings, called oyayubi no seibozō (親指の聖母像, "Thumb-sized Image of Virgin Mary") was designated an Important Cultural Property by the MEXT and is now housed in the Tokyo National Museum.

In 2014, the remains of Sidotti was discovered during the excavations of the former Kirishitan Yashiki. With a 2 million yen grant, Tokyo's National Museum of Nature and Science reconstructed his face through the reassembled fragments of his skull.

See also
 Sakoku
 List of Westerners who visited Japan before 1868

References 

Much of the content of this article comes from the equivalent Japanese-language Wikipedia article (retrieved April 1, 2006).
Tokyo ward touts possible discovery of Italian priest’s remains

1668 births
1714 deaths
Italian expatriates in Japan
17th-century Italian Jesuits
Jesuit missionaries in Japan
Italian Roman Catholic missionaries
Italian people imprisoned abroad
Italian people who died in prison custody
Prisoners who died in Japanese detention
Clergy from Palermo
18th-century Italian Jesuits